The year 2015 was marked, in science fiction, by the following events.

Events 

 April 2015 : last publication of the French magazine  Fiction, founded in 1953.
 October 21, 2015: worldwide celebration of the Back to the Future Part II Day. It coincided with the release of two working hoverboard prototypes by Hendo and Lexus; release of a Back to the Future documentary Back in Time and various other related fan events.

Deaths 
 January 9 : Michel Jeury, French writer (born 1934).
 January 27 : Suzette Haden Elgin, American writer (born 1936)
 February 27 : Leonard Nimoy American actor, director, writer and playwright. (born 1931)
 March 12 : Terry Pratchett, British writer (born 1948)
 May 24 : Tanith Lee, British writer (born 1947)
 May 30 : Joël Champetier, Canadian writer (born 1957)
 June 7 : Christopher Lee, British actor (born 1922)
 June 10 : Wolfgang Jeschke, German writer (born 1936)
 October 27 : Ayerdhal, French writer (born 1959)
 December 25 : George Clayton Johnson, American writer (born 1929)

Literary releases

Novels 
  Léviathan, by Jack Campbell.
 Metro 2035, by Dmitry Glukhovsky.
 Nemesis Games, by James S. A. Corey
  The Produceurs, by Antoine Bello.
 Golden Son by Pierce Brown
 Aurora by Kim Stanley Robinson
 Killing Titan by Greg Bear
 Luna: New Moon by Ian McDonald
 Star Wars: Aftermath by Chuck Wendig.

Novellas 
The Vital Abyss by James S.A. Corey

Stories collections 
  La Ménagerie de papier, by Ken Liu.

Short stories

Comics

Films

Original/new franchise
 Area 51, by Oren Peli. 
 Avril et le Monde truqué, by Franck Ekinci and Christian Desmares.
 Chappie, by Neill Blomkamp.
 Ex Machina, by Alex Garland.
 Impossible by Sun Zhou
 Jupiter Ascending, by The Wachowskis.
 The Martian, by Ridley Scott.
 Project Almanac, by Dean Israelite.
 Self/less, by Tarsem Singh.
 Tomorrowland, by Brad Bird.
  Subconscious, by Georgia Hilton.
 Z for Zachariah, by Craig Zobel.

Sequels, spin-offs and remakes
 The Divergent Series: Insurgent, by Robert Schwentke.
 Mad Max: Fury Road, by George Miller.
 Maze Runner: The Scorch Trials, by Wes Ball.
 Star Wars: The Force Awakens, by J. J. Abrams
 Terminator Genisys, by Alan Taylor.

Television

New series
 12 Monkeys
 Childhood's End
 Dark Matter
 The Expanse
 Humans
 Killjoys
 Minority Report
 Other Space

Returning series
 Doctor Who: series 9 and special episode The Husbands of River Song
 Rick and Morty (season 2)
 Star Wars Rebels (season #2).
 Steven Universe (season 2)

Video games 
 Halo 5: Guardians

Awards

Hugo Award 

Best dramatic presentation (long form) - Guardians of the Galaxy
Best dramatic presentation (short form) - Orphan Black: "By Means Which Have Never Yet Been Tried"

Nebula Award 

Best novel: Annihilation by Jeff VanderMeer

Ray Bradbury Award: George Miller, Brendan McCarthy and Nico Lathouris for Mad Max: Fury Road

Locus Award 

Best Science Fiction Novel: Ancillary Sword by Ann Leckie

Saturn Award 

Best science fiction film: Interstellar

Grand Prix de l'Imaginaire Award

Prix Rosny-Aîné Award

BSFA Award

Sidewise Award for Alternate History

Arthur C. Clarke Award

Edward E. Smith Memorial Award

Kurd-Laßwitz-Preis

Seiun Award

Academy Award
 Interstellar for best visual effects.
 Big Hero 6 for best animated feature film.

See also 
 2015 in science

References

Science fiction by year

science-fiction